Mộc Châu is a rural district of Sơn La province in the Northwest region of Vietnam, 200 kilometers from Hanoi. As of 2019 the district had a population of 114,460. The district covers an area of 1,081.66 km², ranking 8th  among  12  city  districts  of  Son  La  Province. The district capital lies at Mộc Châu.

Moc Chau belongs to the highland landscape class in the horizontal classification system of Vietnamese landscape, with characteristics of climate, ecology and human life.

Moc Chau is distributed on the terrain with an average elevation of more than 1,050 m above the sea level. The annual average temperature of Moc Chau is 18.7 °C, it has cool climate due to lying between the Da River (northeast) and Ma River (southwest). These two river systems act as two natural air conditioning systems. At the same time, Moc Chau has a high climate division along the belt, so it has both the characteristics of the subtropical and temperate highland climate, which is very convenient for developing tourism for the whole year.

Moc Chau is popular with Vietnamese and international tourists for its  hill tribes such as White & Black Thai People and Muong People, the green tea hills, Mộc Châu milk, the natural landscape of Dải Yếm waterfalls, Hill Pine and Orchid Garden flowers.

Gallery

References

Districts of Sơn La province
Sơn La province